Grammitis (dwarf polypody) is a genus of ferns in the family Polypodiaceae, subfamily Grammitidoideae, according to the Pteridophyte Phylogeny Group classification of 2016 (PPG I). It had formerly been placed in the family Grammitidaceae, but this family is no longer recognized by most authors because phylogenetic analyses of DNA sequences have shown that it is embedded in Polypodiaceae.

The delimitation of Grammitis was drastically narrowed in the first decade of the 21st century. It now contains about 25 species. In 2003, a study of the distribution of grammitid ferns placed 11 species in the New World, 7 in Africa, and 4 in the Pacific.

The genus Grammitis was established by Olof Swartz around 1801. (sources vary on the exact date). The name is derived from Greek, gramma, grammatos meaning "a line or thread" and refers to the arrangement of the sori in some species. The  type species for Grammitis is Grammitis marginella.

The only known fossil of a grammitid fern has been named Grammitis succinea, but it is not clear that it belongs to Grammitis as more recently defined. It was found in Oligocene amber from the Dominican Republic.

Circumscription
In a treatment of Grammitidaceae in 1990, Barbara S. Parris defined Grammitis broadly, to include about 400 species. At that time, she stated that "The treatment of Grammitis here as a large and diverse genus reflects our current lack of knowledge concerning relationships within the family". Other authors at that time circumscribed Grammitis more narrowly, to include about 200 species.

Since about 2003, Grammitis has been understood as a genus of about 25 species with the other species to be eventually transferred to other genera, most of them new or resurrected. Grammitis sensu strictissimo (about 25 species) is distinguished by its black, sclerified leaf margins. It is sister to the monophyletic genus Cochlidium.
                       
In 2004, Grammitis was shown to be polyphyletic if broadly circumscribed.  Grammitis tenella had been shown to be closely related to Adenophorus in 2003, and the new combination Adenophorus tenellus was published in 2008. Several species formerly in Grammitis have been transferred to Oreogrammitis. These include Oreogrammitis clemensiae, Oreogrammitis hookeri, and others. The genera Ctenopterella, Dasygrammitis, Radiogrammitis, Tomophyllum, and Xiphopterella were established in 2007 and some of these contain species that were formerly in Grammitis. Lellingeria tomensis was moved out of Grammitis to Lellingeria in 2004. Transfers to other genera have also been made. The classification of Grammitis basalis, Grammitis recondita, and others remains undecided.

Species
The species list is incomplete and may contain synonyms. It was originally based on two very old sources.

Transferred species

References

External links
 Schrader's Journal für die Botanik
 CRC World Dictionary of Plant Names: D-L — At: Botany & Plant Science; At: Life Science At: CRC Press

 
Fern genera
Taxonomy articles created by Polbot
Taxa named by Olof Swartz